Roché Peak is a conspicuous peak rising to , the highest feature on Bird Island, South Georgia. The name La Roche Strait, for the nearby strait between Bird Island and South Georgia, was used for many years but has now been replaced in usage by Bird Sound. The name Roché Peak, given by the UK Antarctic Place-names Committee in 1960, preserves the original name for the area. The Englishman merchant Anthony de la Roché discovered South Georgia in 1675.

See also
 Bird Island, South Georgia
 Anthony de la Roché
 Roché Glacier

Mountains and hills of South Georgia